Jetro Danovich Sexer Willems (born 30 March 1994) is a Dutch professional footballer who plays as a left wing-back or left-back for Groningen.

Willems represented the Netherlands national team at UEFA Euro 2012; he played in the Netherlands' opening match of the tournament at the age of 18 years and 71 days, making him the youngest player ever to play in the UEFA European Championship at the time. The record has since been broken by Jude Bellingham, who represented England at UEFA Euro 2020.

Club career

Sparta Rotterdam
Willems began his career with amateur side Spartaan '20 from whom he joined Sparta Rotterdam. During his time with Sparta he progressed through the club's youth academy and made his senior debut on 16 January 2011, in a match against Go Ahead Eagles. He made 16 appearances in the Dutch second division.

PSV

On 31 August 2011, Willems joined PSV Eindhoven on a three-year contract. He received the number 43 jersey and made his PSV debut on 23 October in a match against Vitesse. Willems became the youngest Dutchman to play in a UEFA competition when he started against Hapoel Tel Aviv on 3 November in a UEFA Europa League group stage match. That same month, he was permanently promoted to the first team squad.

In December, Willems was targeted for a move to Manchester United, with then United manager Sir Alex Ferguson looking for "the next Patrice Evra". On 3 April 2012, Willems' contract was upgraded and extended until 2016.

Willems scored his first professional – and PSV – goal on 22 April 2012 in a match against NEC. With this goal, he became the youngest goalscorer in the 2011–12 Eredivisie. He experienced a great amount of playing time in the 2011–12 season because full-back Erik Pieters was injured. Although being young and quite inexperienced, Willems quickly showed evidence of his raw talent, especially his technique and attacking traits.

On 15 July 2015, Willems suffered a serious injury and missed the first half of the 2015–16 season.

Eintracht Frankfurt 
On 17 July 2017, Willems joined Bundesliga club Eintracht Frankfurt to replace Bastian Oczipka, who, in turn joined Schalke 04. The transfer fee paid to PSV was reported as between €5 million and €9 million, depending on the source. Willems made 29 appearances during the 2017–18 season, which included the surprise win over Bayern Munich in the German Cup final.

Willems started the 2018–19 season by starting in the German Super Cup.

2019–20 season: Loan to Newcastle United
On 2 August 2019, Willems joined Newcastle United of the Premier League on a season-long loan deal with an option to buy. Willems scored his first goal for Newcastle and in the Premier League on 14 September, putting the Magpies into a shock lead at reigning UEFA Champions League winners Liverpool, but the side eventually fell to a 1–3 defeat. Willems then scored in a 2–2 draw with reigning league champions Manchester City on 30 November.

He was ever-present in the Newcastle side during the first half of the season and made 20 appearances for the Magpies, until he suffered a season ending injury when he tore his ACL in January 2020. He left the club when his loan expired on 1 July 2020.

Consequently, Willems returned to Frankfurt for the 2020-21 Bundesliga season. During the first half of the season, he continued his recovery from his knee injury. After almost a year of rehabilitation, Willems re-joined the group training of Eintracht Frankfurt at the beginning of 2021, but did not make any appearances for the rest of the season. Willems left Eintracht Frankfurt after his contract expired at the end of the season. In total, he made 65 appearances for the club.

Greuther Fürth
In August 2021, Willems signed a two-year contract with newly promoted Bundesliga side Greuther Fürth and has been given the number 15 jersey. He left the club on 1 September 2022, after his contract was terminated.

Groningen
On 23 February 2023, Willems joined Eredivisie club Groningen on a contract until the end of the season.

International career

In 2011, Willems won the 2011 UEFA European Under-17 Championship with the Netherlands under-17 team. While being selected for the under-19 squad, on 7 May 2012 Willems was named in the provisional list of 36 players for UEFA Euro 2012, one of nine uncapped players to be chosen by senior team manager Bert van Marwijk as part of the preliminary squad. He was still in the Oranje squad for Euro 2012 after Van Marwijk had made a first cut to 27 players on 15 May 2012. Willems also made the final cut into the 23-man squad, being given the number 15 shirt. He made his first unofficial appearance for the senior national team on 22 May 2012 in a friendly match against Bayern Munich.

On 26 May 2012, Willems made his first appearance with the senior Dutch side in a match against Bulgaria.

At the Euro 2012, Willems made his first start for the Netherlands, against Denmark, becoming the youngest ever player to play at the Euros and the fourth-youngest player to play for the Netherlands, at 18 years and 71 days of age. The record was previously held by Belgian Enzo Scifo, at 18 years and 115 days. He featured in all the group stage games, however the Netherlands were eliminated from the tournament after losing all three group stage matches.

Career statistics

Club

International

Honours 
PSV
 Eredivisie: 2014–15, 2015–16
 KNVB Cup: 2011–12
 Johan Cruyff Shield: 2012, 2016

Eintracht Frankfurt
 DFB-Pokal: 2017–18

Netherlands U17
 UEFA European Under-17 Championship: 2011

References

External links
 
 
 Jetro Willems at Voetbal International 
 
 
 

1994 births
Living people
Footballers from Rotterdam
Dutch footballers
Netherlands youth international footballers
Netherlands under-21 international footballers
Netherlands international footballers
Association football defenders
Sparta Rotterdam players
PSV Eindhoven players
Eintracht Frankfurt players
Newcastle United F.C. players
SpVgg Greuther Fürth players
FC Groningen players
Eerste Divisie players
Eredivisie players
Bundesliga players
Premier League players
UEFA Euro 2012 players
Dutch expatriate footballers
Expatriate footballers in England
Expatriate footballers in Germany
Dutch expatriate sportspeople in England
Dutch expatriate sportspeople in Germany
Dutch people of Curaçao descent